Space Monkey is a cloud storage company founded by Clint Gordon-Carroll and Alen Peacock in 2011. Space Monkey created a cloud storage service that puts consumer data both on a hard drive located in the home and backed up on other devices. The company's user network is distributed through the cloud. The service prevents data loss due to failing hardware while allowing consumers to access their files anywhere in the world via the cloud.
  
In September 2014, Vivint, a home automation company, acquired Space Monkey for an undisclosed amount.

History
Space Monkey was founded by Clint Gordon-Carroll and Alen Peacock in 2011. Gordon-Carroll and Peacock met while both working at Mozy in 2007. 
A presentation by Peacock won the company first place as "Best New Startup" at the TechCrunch's Launch Festival in March 2012.

Space Monkey raised $2.7 million of venture capital in a Series A round led by Google Ventures that same year. The company went live in April 2013. It raised $349,625–350% of its initial $100,000 goal–in a 2013 Kickstarter campaign. In September 2014, Vivint acquired Space Monkey for an undisclosed amount.

As of February 2016, Space Monkey is the world's largest peer-to-peer storage network.

Operations
Space Monkey has a cloud storage service that allows a consumer to put 1-terabyte of data on a hard drive located on-premises. The data is then backed up on other devices across Space Monkey's user network via a distributed cloud. The service prevents data loss due to failing hardware while allowing consumers access to their files anywhere in the world via the cloud.

See also
Cloud computing
Vivint
Web hosting
Data storage device

References

External links
Official site

Companies established in 2011